Emporium Mall is a shopping mall located in Johar Town, Lahore southwest of Lahore International Expo Centre. The 11-storey mall is spread over 2.7 million square feet and is home to over 200 stores and a five-star hotel. Opened in 2016, it is the third largest mall in Pakistan after the Lucky One Mall in Karachi and The Grand Central Mall (Under construction) in Faisalabad and also one of the largest shopping malls of the world by gross leasable area. The Mall is managed by the Nishat Group. According to the mall's website, their daily estimated visitors are 44 thousand people.

History

The mall's architecture was developed by AHR Architects, an international architectural firm and  AHR Ali Naqvi Architects Local Architectural Firm. Emporium Mall is located in Johar Town northeast of Lahore International Expo Centre and is home to over 200 stores including Hyperstar supermarket, Universal Cinemas, and a five-star hotel.
In late 2012 or early 2013, Aedas was appointed to design the mall's architecture with cinemas, food courts, a hotel, retail space and wedding facilities, with construction expected to start in March 2013.

The construction started in March 2013 with the cost of approximately rupees 25 billion (US$238.43 million). The site or project is owned by Nishat Group, with structural engineers Mushtaq and Bilal. 
The mall opened to the public on 29 June 2016. Even before opening, Hyperstar by Carrefour was already opened, nearly about six month before.

. In 2017, Emporium Mall became the second-largest mall after the construction of Lucky One Mall in Karachi and now Emporium Mall became third-largest mall after construction of The Grand Central Mall, Faisalabad. Emporium Mall is also one of the largest shopping malls of the world by gross leasable area. Emporium Mall is home to over 200 International and local brands. It also includes Universal Cinemas, Hyperstar supermarket and a large food court.

Architecture
Emporium Mall is a thirteen-story building including nearly three-story parking ramps underneath the mall, with capacity to hold 2000 cars. The mall is nearly symmetric, with a rectangular floor plan. More than 200 international and local stores are arranged along 5 levels of pedestrian walkways.

Attraction

Emporium Mall is home to over 200 International and local brands. It includes a nine screen multiplex cinema and Pakistan's largest cinema called Universal Cinemas. It also contains a large food court with a sitting area that accommodates 3000 people. Other features include Fun Factory Park (kids play area), The Bounce, banquet halls, restaurants, eateries,  a large hypermarket named Hyperstar (Carrefour) and a 110-Room five star hotel. The mall also uses solar panels for back-up power.

Incidents 
 On 3 January 2018, Muhammad Usman, a 19-year-old electrician, died during repair work. He was trying to repair electric wires on the fourth floor when the ceiling collapsed on him. He sustained severe electric shocks and fell on the second floor from the top.

Gallery

See also

 List of largest shopping malls in the world
 List of shopping malls in Pakistan

References

Retailing in Lahore
Shopping malls in Lahore
Shopping malls in Pakistan
Hotels in Pakistan
Nishat Group
Shopping malls established in 2016
2016 establishments in Pakistan